Rodrigo Ely (born 3 November 1993) is a Brazilian professional footballer who plays as a central defender for Spanish club La Liga club UD Almería.

Club career

Milan
Rodrigo Ely is a youth product of Brazilian club, Grêmio, and joined Milan in 2012. He spent two years with the youth side before subsequent loan spells with several low tier Italian clubs.

Reggina / Varese (loan)
On 24 July 2012, Ely joined Reggina on a season-long loan. On 16 July 2013, AC Milan confirmed that they had reached an agreement for the season-long loan of Ely to Varese.

Avellino
On 21 July 2014, Ely joined Avellino on a free transfer.

Return to Milan
After impressive performances with Avellino in the 2014–15 season, Milan decided to bring him back to San Siro on 10 June 2015, where he signed new contract which will keep him at the club until 30 June 2019. Despite Ely being a free agent, Milan also paid an unknown party a €8 million fee.

He made his first Serie A game of the 2015–16 season with Milan, in a 2–0 defeat against Fiorentina, where he received two yellow cards, thus getting sent off.

Alavés
On 30 January 2017, Ely joined La Liga club Deportivo Alavés on loan for the remainder of the season. He made his debut for the club on 11 March, replacing Ibai Gómez in a 2–1 away win against Málaga CF.

On 17 April 2017, Ely scored his first goal in the main category, netting his team's second in a 2–1 home win against Villarreal CF. On 21 July, he signed a permanent four-year deal with the Basque side.

Nottingham Forest
On 2 September 2021, Ely signed a one-year deal with EFL Championship side Nottingham Forest as a free transfer. On 31 January 2022, it was announced that Forest and Ely had mutually agreed to terminate his contract at the club, without him having made an appearance.

Almería
On 7 March 2022, free agent Ely signed a three-month contract with UD Almería back in Spain, with an option for a further two years.

International career 
Ely played for Italy at Under-19 and Under-20, but was called up by Alexandre Gallo to be a part of his Brazil Under-23 squad, which was preparing to compete at Rio 2016.

Career statistics

Honours

Club 

 Milan
Supercoppa Italiana: 2016

Alavés
Copa del Rey: 2016-17 Runner-up

References

External links

1993 births
Living people
Sportspeople from Rio Grande do Sul
Brazilian people of Italian descent
Italian people of Brazilian descent
Italian footballers
Brazilian footballers
Association football defenders
Serie A players
Serie B players
A.C. Milan players
U.S. Avellino 1912 players
S.S.D. Varese Calcio players
Reggina 1914 players
La Liga players
Deportivo Alavés players
UD Almería players
Italy youth international footballers
Brazil youth international footballers
Nottingham Forest F.C. players
Brazilian expatriate footballers
Brazilian expatriate sportspeople in England